Cotalpa lanigera, also known as the Goldsmith beetle, is a beetle of the family Scarabaeidae. Its adult size ranges from 19 to 26 mm. Its head and pronotum are yellow-brown, while its elytra are usually paler yellow. Nocturnally active, it may be found in late spring to early summer feeding on the leaves of trees such as poplars, silver maple, sweetgum, pear, hickory, or willow.

References

Rutelinae
Beetles described in 1758
Taxa named by Carl Linnaeus